Gary Phillips may refer to:

 Gary Phillips (basketball) (born 1939), basketball player
 Gary Phillips (footballer) (born 1961), football player
 Gary Phillips (Australian footballer) (born 1963), Australian former soccer player and coach
 Gary Phillips (rugby league), New Zealand international
 Gary Phillips (EastEnders) fictional character from EastEnders
 Gary Phillips (keyboardist) (1947–2007), late keyboardist with the Greg Kihn Band
 Gary Phillips (comics), writer who created the comic book series Angeltown
 Gary Phillips (racer), Australian Top Doorslammer drag-racer